Person Colby Cheney (February 25, 1828 – June 19, 1901) was a paper manufacturer, abolitionist and Republican politician from Manchester, New Hampshire. He was the 35th governor of New Hampshire and later represented the state in the United States Senate.

Biography

Cheney was born in Holderness (now Ashland) to abolitionists, Abigail and Moses Cheney. Oren Burbank Cheney, the founder of Bates College, was Person Cheney's older brother. Cheney attended academies in Peterborough and Hancock and the Parsonsfield Seminary in Parsonsfield, Maine. He engaged in the manufacture of paper in Peterborough until 1866, and in 1854 was a member of the New Hampshire House of Representatives.

During the Civil War he was first lieutenant and regimental quartermaster in the Thirteenth Regiment of the New Hampshire Volunteer Infantry (1862–1863). He was state railroad commissioner 1864–1867. He moved to Manchester in 1867 and engaged in business as a dealer in paper stock and continued the manufacture of paper at Goffstown.

Political career
He also engaged in agricultural pursuits until being elected mayor of Manchester in 1871. He was Governor of New Hampshire from 1875 to 1877. Cheney was appointed as a Republican to the United States Senate to fill the vacancy caused by the death of Austin F. Pike, and served from November 24, 1886, to June 14, 1887, when a successor was elected and qualified. He was not a candidate for election to fill the vacancy, and resumed his former manufacturing pursuits.

Cheney served as Envoy Extraordinary and Minister Plenipotentiary to Switzerland in 1892–1893. He died in Dover, Strafford County, New Hampshire in 1901 and is buried in the Pine Grove Cemetery at Manchester.

External links 
 
 Cheney at New Hampshire's Division of Historic Resources
Sketches of Successful New Hampshire Men: Person Colby Cheney

1828 births
1901 deaths
Mayors of Manchester, New Hampshire
People from Goffstown, New Hampshire
Republican Party governors of New Hampshire
Republican Party members of the New Hampshire House of Representatives
Businesspeople in the pulp and paper industry
American abolitionists
Union Army officers
American Unitarians
Ambassadors of the United States to Switzerland
Republican Party United States senators from New Hampshire
19th-century American diplomats
People of New Hampshire in the American Civil War
Activists from New Hampshire
People from Ashland, New Hampshire
19th-century American politicians